Kauniagachhi is one of the oldest villages in the Malda district of West Bengal, India. The village has a population of about 3000 people. Kauniagachhi is situated around 1 Kilometer from Sripur railway station and 4.5 kilometers from Samsi railway station. The village has a majority Muslim population.

Kauniagachhi is a village located in the Sripur-I Gram Panchayat, which falls under the Pukuria Block of the Malda district in the Indian state of West Bengal. It is situated about 38 kilometers from the district headquarters, Malda Town.

The population of Kauniagachhi primarily consists of people from the Muslim community, and the main occupation of the people is agriculture. The village is known for the cultivation of paddy, jute, and wheat. However, due to the lack of irrigation facilities, the villagers face significant challenges in farming and often rely on natural rainfall for their crops.

The village has a primary school for children, but there are no higher secondary or secondary schools in the village. Students from the village often travel to nearby towns for higher education. The village doesn't have primary healthcare center, people of this villages face challenges in their medical emergency needs. 

Kauniagachhi is located in a flood-prone region, and the villagers have faced severe floods in the past, which have caused significant damage to their crops and homes. The village doesn't have concrete road yet and the people are facing problems especially in the rainy season. The government needs to take some measures to address these issues, such as the construction of road, supply drinking water, primary healthcare center and education facility for higher classes.

Overall, Kauniagachhi is a rural village in West Bengal, where agriculture is the primary occupation, and the villagers face several challenges such as floods, healthcare facilities, and lack of irrigation facilities. 

Villages in Malda district